Woodland Beach is an unincorporated community in Anne Arundel County, Maryland, United States.

History
The London Town Publik House was listed on the National Register of Historic Places in 1970.

References

Unincorporated communities in Anne Arundel County, Maryland
Unincorporated communities in Maryland
Maryland populated places on the Chesapeake Bay